Cumilla City Corporation is a self-governed municipal administration in Bangladesh that administers and oversees development and maintenance works in the city of Cumilla. The corporation covers an area of over 53.84 square kilometers in the Cumilla District. The body was known as Cumilla Municipality previously, until it obtained the City Corporation status by a ministry of local government declaration on 10 July 2011. Incumbent Mayor is Arfanul Haque Rifat

History
The Comilla municipality was formed in the mid-1890s and the city remained as a municipality for over 125 years though the number of the population has been rising with time. An administrative proposition, issued from the Comilla district administration, was passed on 20 August 2009. The ministry of local government meeting on 4 March 2011 declared to turn at least four of the populated municipalities into city corporations, largely bringing Comilla as a suggestion as one of the contenders. An administrative move was made on 23 June 2011 abolishing the Comilla Municipality as the final step to introduce the administrative body as a city corporation. Later on 10 July 2011, a ministry gazette named the Comilla Municipality as the new Comilla City Corporation.

The city corporation is run by a joint staff of elected public representatives and government officials. Officials both come from departmental recruitment and the administrative cadre service of the country. The Comilla City Corporation has 37 members, containing 27 councilors, 9 woman councilors led by the mayor. Bangladesh Election Commission is constituted to oversee city corporation polls, which sits in the office for a five-year tenure.
The first ever mayoral election of Comilla City Corporation was held on 5 January 2012, Has an area of 200 kilometers, elected the municipality's Monirul Haque Sakku as its new mayor, 27 councilors and 9 woman councilors from 27 wards.

Services 
The Comilla City Corporation is responsible for administering and providing basic infrastructure to the city.
 Water purification and supply
 Sewage treatment and disposal
 Garbage disposal and street cleanliness
 Solid waste management
 Building and maintenance of roads and streets.
 Street lighting
 Maintenance of parks and open spaces
 Cemeteries and Crematoriums
 Registering of births and deaths
 Conservation of heritage sites
 Disease control, including immunization
 Public municipal schools etc.

List of officeholders

Elections

Election result 2022

Election result 2017

Election result 2012

See also
 List of city corporations in Bangladesh
 Comilla Division

References

Cumilla
City Corporations of Bangladesh
Comilla City Corporation